Thomas Aujero Small (born April 29, 1959) is a Filipino-American public servant currently serving on the City Council of Culver City, California. Previously, he served as Mayor of Culver City from 2018 to 2019. He was elected unanimously as Mayor by his colleagues on the City Council on April 30, 2018 and served until April 2019. Prior to his election to City Council, Small served as Commissioner of Cultural Affairs for the city and was initially sworn into office as a City Council Member on April 30, 2016.

In his public service and political work Small has also represented the API (Asian Pacific Islander) Caucus of the League of California Cities on the League's Housing and Economic Development Policy Committee. Currently, he serves as Chair of the Sustainability Council of the Los Angeles Metropolitan Transit Authority (METRO) and represents the Westside Council of Governments on the Transportation Committee of the Southern California Association of Governments (SCAG). At a national level, he participates in New American Leaders and Local Progress, both based in Washington, D.C.

Early life
Small was born in Palo Alto, CA. His Mother, Elizabeth Aujero Small was born in Dueñas, Iloilo, Philippines, and was the first in her family to emigrate to the United States. His father, attorney Jack C. Small, was born in Tulsa, Oklahoma. The two met 1946 in Manila, where his mother worked at a restaurant that his father built and operated, called the California Drive-In.

He grew up in the San Francisco bay area, while spending summers in Iloilo with his mother's extended family. He graduated from an alternative school, Ravenswood High School in East Palo Alto, and was captain of a state championship club soccer team, and competed nationally in the decathlon.

Small went on today study comparative literature and music at Yale University and graduated in 1982. He sang with the Yale Russian Chorus and toured the former USSR with them in 1977, then spending a gap year in Italy. He was awarded a French National Fellowship for graduate study in literature, film and critical theory at the University of Paris.

Early career
Early in his career, Small worked in film and television. He produced the science fiction film Venus Rising in 1995, and four subsequent architectural documentaries for the A&E Network, including Andrew Carnegie's Skibo Castle and the Palace of Monaco. He later worked as a consultant and writer in architecture and urban planning, and worked on developments including Baku White City in Azerbaijan, the Mall of the Emirates in Dubai, and the modern facilities for Zhouzhuang, China, known as the "Venice of the East."

In 2005, he was awarded a National Endowment for the Arts fellowship at the Columbia University School of Journalism . From 2005 to 2010 he wrote classical music criticism for "Concertonet," an online classical music journal based in Paris, France.

As part of his service as a commissioner of the Cultural Affairs in Culver City, he assisted in creating Culver City's Artist and Poet Laureate Program.

Public Service

Election 
Out of a field of seven candidates, Small was elected to one of two open seats on the Culver City Council in 2016. Leading up to the election, nearly 40 influential architects, designers and engineers from Culver City and across the Los Angeles region announced their support of Small's candidacy.

Tenure on Culver City Council
During his first two years in office, Small initiated and led the Transit Oriented District Visioning process and plan. As part of the 2016 Culver City Strategic Plan, he has also led the Ballona Creek Revitalization Task Force.

He serves on several Culver City Council Subcommittees including: Economic Development; Mobility, Traffic and Parking; and Financial Planning and Budget. In 2017, Small was appointed to the League of California Cities’ Housing, Community and Economic Development Policy Committee representing the League's Asian Pacific Islander Caucus. In 2018, he was appointed to the Los Angeles METRO Sustainability Council and subsequently elected Chair of the Council. The following year, he was appointed by the Los Angeles Westside Council of Governments to the Transportation Policy Committee of the SCAG.

Mayor of Culver City
Small was elected Mayor of the City of Culver City unanimously by his colleagues on the City Council City on April 30, 2018.

During Small's tenure as Mayor, Amazon and Apple have broken ground on new studios based in Culver City, and HBO is constructing new headquarters nearby. Between these three major multinational companies, Culver City is expecting an influx of up to 10,000 new employees over the next few years. It was this anticipated and significant boom that motivated Small to lead the charge for increased and accessible mobility as a part of the City’s vision for smart and sustainable growth.

While serving as mayor, Small concentrated on excellence in urban planning, sustainable design, mobility, and public outreach. He serves on the Culver City General Plan Update Subcommittee and was instrumental in the composition of the Request for Proposal (RFP) and selection of the General Plan consultant team. Small may be best known for his advocacy for Transit Oriented Development and well-connected multimodal transit as a part of Culver City's future development.

Small has led the effort to win grants for programs to enhance public outreach for neighborhood planning and alternative modes of transportation from the Mayor's Innovation Project, the Harvard Behavioral Insights Group, and the National Institute for Civil Discourse (NICD). Under his leadership, Culver City was selected by the University of Arizona’s NICD as one of five "deep dive" cities to participate in its "Revive Civility Cities" program—a nonpartisan program, that works with and encourages communities to restore values of civility and respect among all its members. NICD worked with Culver City during 2018 and 2019 to illuminate and examine the city's civil discourse strategies around the issue of growth and development in the Fox Hills neighborhood.

In 2018, while still in the first part of his mayoral term, Small was appointed to the LA METRO Sustainability Council and was subsequently elected Chair. Later that same year, Small hosted and gave a keynote address for the 2018 Annual Meeting of the Society for Decision Making Under Deep Uncertainty (DMDU) with the RAND Corporation in Culver City. And in the following year, he was appointed by the Los Angeles Westside Council of Governments to the Transportation Policy Committee of SCAG.

As an extension of the Culver City Transit Oriented Development Visioning Process (began in 2017 with Craig Nelson of Steer Davies Gleave), Small collaborated with RAND on a mobility implementation study in Culver City's Rancho Higuera neighborhood. Details chronicling their work was published in 2020, and examined two key decision-making tracks within their process and examines a series of “scenario-visioning and stress-testing workshops,” that led to the creation of an updated vision plan for residents’ local mobility.

Cultural Affairs Commission 
Small served on a five-member team of the City of Culver City's Cultural Affairs Commission from June 2014 to April 2016. The commission's responsibility was to “[a]ct in an advisory capacity to the City Council on matters pertaining to the enrichment of the community through fine arts, visual arts, performing arts, arts education, historic preservation and cultural issues; Serve as an advocate for cultural activities and programs within the City.” This included implementing the “City's Public Art Program, and encourage the integration of cultural affairs into the social and economic fabric of the City to improve the quality of life for City residents.”

During Small's tenure, he also sat on the Historic Preservation subcommittee.

Jacaranda Music 
Small's longtime love of music found a new manifestation in 2003 with the founding of Jacaranda Music, a concert series focused on new and undiscovered classical music. Small, described as a "new music philanthropist," served as a founding board member of Jacaranda Music in 2007, later becoming chair of the board. Today he serves as vice chair.

Jacaranda recently launched METRO (Music Education Through Resource Opportunities) to network and mobilize university music students from CalArts, Chapman University, CSUN, UCLA, and USC through recorded music services, Facebook, and live concerts. Maintaining high performance standards in acoustically effective locations throughout Greater Los Angeles.

In February 2020, Jacaranda unveiled its new record label—Jacaranda Live Recordings—to create continued access between Jacaranda Music's audience and rising classical musicians during the COVID-19 pandemic.

More information can be found on the page for Jacaranda Music.

Personal life
Small is married to independent communications consultant Joanna Brody. They and their two children live in Culver City. Their home, "Residence for a Briard," was designed by architect Whitney Sander and completed in 2007. The home was designed to host chamber music concerts, and has hosted the Calder Quartet, Jacaranda Music, and Vox Femina Los Angeles.

References

1959 births
Living people
People from Culver City, California
Mayors of places in California